In enzymology, a glutamine N-phenylacetyltransferase is an enzyme that catalyzes the chemical reaction

phenylacetyl-CoA + L-glutamine  CoA + alpha-N-phenylacetyl-L-glutamine

Thus, the two substrates of this enzyme are phenylacetyl-CoA and L-glutamine, whereas its two products are CoA and alpha-N-phenylacetyl-L-glutamine.

This enzyme belongs to the family of transferases, specifically those acyltransferases transferring groups other than aminoacyl groups.  The systematic name of this enzyme class is phenylacetyl-CoA:L-glutamine alpha-N-phenylacetyltransferase. Other names in common use include glutamine phenylacetyltransferase, and phenylacetyl-CoA:L-glutamine N-acetyltransferase.  This enzyme participates in tyrosine metabolism and phenylalanine metabolism.

References 

 

EC 2.3.1
Enzymes of unknown structure